Stephen Hobbs (1815-1893) was an Anglican Archdeacon.
Hobbs was educated at the Church Missionary Society College, Islington
and ordained in 1839. He served in India at Palamcottah, Tinnevelly, Nallur, Sathankulam, Dohnavur and Suviseshapuram. In 1856 he was transferred to Mauritius, serving firstly at Plaines Wilhems then Creve coeur. He was appointed Archdeacon of the Seychelles from 1871 until 1873;  then of Mauritius from 1873 to 1879.

References

1815 births
1893 deaths
19th-century Indian Anglican priests
Archdeacons of Mauritius
Alumni of the Church Missionary Society College, Islington
Archdeacons of the Seychelles